Denis Vladimirovich Matveev (Russian Cyrillic: Денис Владимирович Матвеев; born April 25, 1983, in Leningrad, RSFSR, now St. Petersburg, Russia) is a Russian cosmonaut.

Biography
Matveev received his degree in computing and networks from the Bauman Moscow State Technical University in 2006.  After graduation, Matveev began working at the Yuri Gagarin Cosmonaut Training Center in Star City, Russia as a junior research assistant.  He was promoted to engineer in 2009.

Matveev was selected as a cosmonaut in 2010.  He was appointed to begin training on October 12, 2010, and was named a test cosmonaut on July 31, 2012.

The Russian magazine Cosmonautics News reported that Matveev had been selected as a flight engineer for the Soyuz MS-06 spaceflight to the International Space Station; however, he did not launch on this mission, and was replaced by Ivan Vagner.  Ultimately, neither Vagner nor Matveev flew on this mission. He was reassigned to Soyuz MS-21, which launched on March 18, 2022. After 194 days, MS-21 landed in Kazakhstan on September 29, 2022.

References

External links

 Astronaut.ru biography
 Roscosmos biography
 Spacefacts biography

1983 births
Living people
Bauman Moscow State Technical University alumni
Writers from Saint Petersburg
Russian cosmonauts
Spacewalkers